Christopher Robert Hopper  (18 August 1918 – 19 September 2009) was manager and secretary of London's Royal Albert Hall.

He appeared as a castaway on the BBC Radio programme Desert Island Discs on 7 February 1966.

He was a Member of the Royal Victorian Order.

References 

1918 births
People from Newcastle upon Tyne
2009 deaths
Place of death missing
Royal Albert Hall
Members of the Royal Victorian Order